Adela violella is a moth of the Adelidae family. It is found in most of Europe, except Ireland, Great Britain, Fennoscandia, the Baltic region, Croatia, Greece and Portugal.

The wingspan is about 11 mm.  Adults are on wing from June to July.

The larvae feed on the flowers and seeds of St. John's wort (Hypericum perforatum).

References

External links
lepiforum.de

Adelidae
Moths described in 1775
Moths of Europe
Taxa named by Michael Denis
Taxa named by Ignaz Schiffermüller